Uprooted is the debut studio album by indie rock group The Antlers. The album was self-released online in 2006.

Peter Silberman has stated that when beginning the band as a solo project, his approach to home recording and production was largely inspired by the techniques of lo-fi musician Phil Elverum (The Microphones and Mount Eerie); in particular, that of the critically acclaimed 2001 release, The Glow Pt. 2. As a result, this influence may be heard throughout parts of the album, as well as on later works such as In the Attic of the Universe.

Track listing

Personnel
Peter Silberman - Vocals, Instruments, Engineering, Mixing
Nick Principe - Mixing
Duston Spear - Artwork

References

External links
Uprooted on Allmusic
Uprooted on Rate Your Music
Uprooted on Amazon

2006 albums
The Antlers (band) albums